Borislava Botusharova (born 26 November 1994) is a former professional tennis player from Bulgaria.

She has been an Old Dominion University tennis player. Botusharova was named the No. 6 ranked Newcomer/Freshman in the entire NCAA entering her first semester of college at ODU (Fall 2014). On 28 October 2013, she reached her highest WTA singles ranking of world No. 407 whilst her best doubles ranking was No. 702 on 9 September 2013. She has also played once for the Bulgarian Fed Cup team in 2014, when she lost her singles match.

Professional career

ITF Circuit and college tennis
Botusharova made her debut in 2005 and started playing on the ITF Junior Circuit. She won several junior titles and played her first match on the pro circuit in 2009 and won her first and only title on the ITF Women's Circuit in 2013 in Varna, Bulgaria. In 2014, she was called up in the Bulgaria Fed Cup team.
In the same year, Botushrova began studying Tourism Management at the Old Dominion University in Norfolk, Virginia, United States. She started playing college tennis and received the Conference U.S. Player of the Week award.

She played her last match at a $10k event in Adana, Turkey, in June 2014.

Personal life
Botusharova was born on November 28, 1994 in Pazardzhik, Bulgaria. She started playing tennis when she was five years old and her coach was mother Silvia. Botusharova's cousin is fellow Bulgarian tennis player Vivian Zlatanova.

ITF Circuit finals

Singles: 3 (1 title, 2 runner–ups)

Doubles: 3 (3 runner–ups)

Fed Cup
Botusharova debuted for the Bulgaria Fed Cup team in 2014, she has a 0–1 overall record.

Singles (0–1)

References

External links
 
 
 

1994 births
Living people
Bulgarian female tennis players
Sportspeople from Pazardzhik